Wiarton/Beattie Lake Water Aerodrome  is located  north northwest of Wiarton, Ontario, Canada.

References

Transport in Bruce County
Buildings and structures in Bruce County
Seaplane bases in Ontario